Yang Junjing (born 15 May 1989 in Zhengzhou, Henan) is a Chinese volleyball player. She is the middle blocker of China women's national volleyball team, participating in the 2012 Summer Olympics.

Career
Yang played at the 2013 Club World Championship with Guangdong Evergrande winning the bronze medal after defeating 3-1 to Voléro Zürich.

Clubs
  Nanjing Forces (2007 - 2009)
  Bayi (2009 - 2013, 2014–present)
  Guangdong Evergrande (2013 - 2014)

Awards

Individuals
 2011 Asian Women's Volleyball Championship "Best Blocker"
 2014 FIVB Volleyball Women's World Championship "Best Middle Blocker"

Clubs
 2013 Club World Championship -  Bronze medal, with Guangdong Evergrande

See also
China at the 2012 Summer Olympics#Volleyball
Volleyball at the 2012 Summer Olympics – Women's tournament.

References

FIVB Biography

1989 births
Living people
Volleyball players from Henan
People from Zhengzhou
Olympic volleyball players of China
Volleyball players at the 2012 Summer Olympics
Chinese women's volleyball players
Middle blockers
21st-century Chinese women